Siddharth Suchde (born 20 January 1985, in Mumbai) is a professional squash player from India. He grew up in India, Scotland and Switzerland. He studied in Cathedral School in Bombay and completed his high school education from Merchiston Castle School in Edinburgh, Scotland. Later, he attended Harvard University from 2003-2007 as an undergraduate, where he received a degree in Economics.

The year that he graduated from Harvard, Suchde became National Champion of college level squash in the US, despite the title had eluding him during the first three years of his undergraduate life. His freshman year he stood Fourth, Sophomore year third and Junior Year he was runner-up in the same championship. He held the number one spot on the team for most of his time there. 
 
After completing his education, Suchde moved to Harrogate, England, where he lived and trained and constantly travelled all over the world to play squash.

His highest world ranking to date is 39. He is the second highest ranked Indian squash player in the world.

In 2012, Suchde retired from professional squash and founded LiveYourSport.com an online sports e-commerce company.

PSA Tour Titles

PSA Tour Finals (Runner-Up)

External links 
 
 
 
 
 Suchde wins his first PSA title
 Suchde becomes CSA national Champion
 Ivy League Rookie of the Year

1985 births
Living people
Indian male squash players
Harvard Crimson men's squash players
People educated at Merchiston Castle School
Squash players at the 2010 Commonwealth Games
Asian Games medalists in squash
Asian Games bronze medalists for India
Squash players at the 2010 Asian Games
Medalists at the 2010 Asian Games
Harvard University alumni
Commonwealth Games competitors for India